"Wicked Garden" is a song by the American rock band Stone Temple Pilots that appears on their debut studio album, Core. The song was never released as a commercial single (only as a radio promo) but is still considered to be one of the band's biggest hits and appears on their greatest hits compilation, Thank You. The song's lyrics were written by Scott Weiland and the music was written by brothers Robert and Dean DeLeo.

Song meaning
Scott Weiland stated that "'Wicked Garden' is a song about people allowing all their innocence and purity to be lost from their lives."

Other versions
An original version of "Wicked Garden" appeared on the Mighty Joe Young Demo in 1990. 
STP performed an acoustic version of "Wicked Garden" on MTV Unplugged in 1993. The video of this version appears on Thank You DVD.
The band also performed the song on the Late Show with David Letterman in 1993, and in 2013, during the KROQ Weenie Roast, as the surprise super-star band of the evening.
A live version of the song appears on the soundtrack for the 2001 Family Values Tour.

Chart positions

References

1992 songs
Stone Temple Pilots songs
Songs written by Scott Weiland
Songs written by Robert DeLeo
Songs written by Dean DeLeo
Song recordings produced by Brendan O'Brien (record producer)
Atlantic Records singles
Acid rock songs